Aline Dias Pacheco (Leopoldina, 19 September 1991) is a Brazilian actress and model.

Filmography

TV
 Malhação (2012 - 2013)
 Sangue Bom (2013) 
 Questão de Família (2014)
 Sexo e as Negas (2014)
 Malhação (2016 - 2017) 
 O Tempo Não Para (2018 - 2019)

Movie

References

External links

Brazilian television actresses
20th-century Brazilian actresses
1991 births
Living people
21st-century Brazilian actresses
Brazilian female models
People from Minas Gerais